The Municipality of Ljubno is a municipality in northern Slovenia. The seat of the municipality is the town of Ljubno ob Savinji.

Settlements
In addition to the municipal seat of Ljubno ob Savinji, the municipality also includes the following settlements:
 Juvanje
 Meliše
 Okonina
 Planina
 Primož pri Ljubnem
 Radmirje
 Savina
 Ter

References

External links
 
 Municipality of Ljubno on Geopedia
 Ljubno municipal site 

Ljubno